Future Institute of Technology (FIT), in Garia, West Bengal, India, offers degree level engineering courses which are affiliated to West Bengal University of Technology (WBUT). It is affiliated to AICTE.

See also
List of institutions of higher education in West Bengal
Education in India
Education in West Bengal

References

External links 
http://www.future-technology.in/

Universities and colleges in South 24 Parganas district
Colleges affiliated to West Bengal University of Technology
2014 establishments in West Bengal
Educational institutions established in 2014